Maninee De is an Indian film and TV actress who rose to stardom by playing the role of Katiya in Ssshhhh...Koi Hai, the horror TV Series on STAR Plus, Pari Kapadia in Sony Entertainment Television's popular serial, Jassi Jaissi Koi Nahin.  She is also well known for her role as Dr Sonali Barwe in C.I.D. She has been seen in many TV serials. She has also appeared in film. She played the role of Shagun in Serial Laado 2. In 2021, She is playing the role of Pam in Kuch Toh Hai: Naagin Ek Naye Rang Mein on Colors TV

Personal life

Maninee De was married to actor Mihir Mishra, who has appeared as Dr Rahul in the popular TV serial Sanjivani.

News reports confirms, they have been separated recently.

Career

Maninee De was first recognized for playing Pari Kapadia, the best friend of villain Mallika, in the TV serial Jassi Jaissi Koi Nahin.

Maninee played Aunt Chanchal in the TV series Ghar Ki Lakshmi Betiyaan. In 2005, she had a part in The Great Indian Comedy Show of Star One, and was also in the reality show Nach Baliye with her husband. Maninee De played Ragini in SAB TV's serial Twinkle Beauty Parlour, and also appeared in the popular show Remix. Maninee has also appeared as Dr Sonali Barwe, a forensic expert, in the detective series C.I.D. from 2010 to 2011 (episode no. 620 - 663 and 713 - 730).

She also appeared in the popular Sahara one drama Kesariya Balam Aavo Hamare Des.

In 2006, Maninee appeared in the film Krrish, as a friend of the character of Priyanka Chopra.

In 2007, she was seen as Ambalika in Naaginn.

In 2008, Maninee appeared in the film Fashion as Sheena Bajaj, a fashion magazine expert.

In 2009-2010, she appeared in the youth oriented Disney show Kya Mast Hai Life. She portrayed the role of a Bollywood superstar mother, Sushmita Juneja, who cannot speak Hindi properly.

She also portrayed the role of Vijaya, elder sister of Sati, portrayed by Mouni Roy in mythological serial Devon Ke Dev – Mahadev.

From 2011, she is occasionally seen in courtroom drama Adaalat as prosecution lawyer "Devyani Bose".

She had featured in Student of the Year where she played the role of Geetha, Abhimanyu (Siddharth Malhotra)'s bad aunt.

She was part of Shashi-Sumeet Mittal's popular show Diya Aur Baati Hum, aired on Star Plus and portrayed the character of inspector Singh.
Of late she was in the star plus show pardes mein hai mera dil

Maninee De was one of the top ten finalists in the 1994 Miss India beauty pageant.

Filmography

Television

Films

Web series

Dubbing roles

Live action films

Live action series

References

External links

Living people
Indian film actresses
Indian soap opera actresses
Year of birth missing (living people)